William or Bill Clarke may refer to:

Entertainment
 William Hanna Clarke (1882–1924), dentist, then an artist, from Glasgow, Scotland
 William Clarke (musician) (1951–1996), blues harmonica player
 Will Clarke (novelist) (born 1970), American novelist
 William Clarke, a.k.a. Bunny Rugs, lead singer for the band Third World

Politics
 William Clarke (MP for Amersham) (c. 1575–1626), English MP for Amersham
 William Clarke (English politician) (c. 1623–1666), English politician and Secretary to the Council of the Army
 William Clarke (mayor), American mayor of Jersey City, New Jersey, 1869
 William Clarke (Australian politician) (1843–1903), Australian businessman and parliamentarian
 William Clarke (Fabian) (1852–1901), English socialist activist
 William Aurelius Clarke (1868–1940), Canadian politician in Ontario
 William Alexander Clarke, a.k.a. Alexander Bustamante (1884–1977), first prime minister of Jamaica
 Bill Clarke (politician) (born 1933), Canadian MP for Vancouver Quadra, 1973–1984

Sports

Football
 William Clarke (footballer, fl. 1897–1900), English football forward with Lincoln City in the late 1890s
 William Clarke (footballer, born 1909) (1909–?), for Bradford City
 Bill Clarke (Australian footballer) (1882–1945), Australian rules footballer
 Bill Clarke (Canadian football) (1932–2000), Canadian football defensive lineman
 Bill Clarke (football manager), English Carlisle United F.C. manager, 1933–1935
 Bill Clarke (footballer, born 1880) (1880–?), English footballer with Sheffield United, Northampton Town and Southampton
 Bill Clarke (footballer, born 1916) (1916–1986), English footballer with Leicester City, Exeter and Southampton
 Willie Clarke (footballer) (1878–1940), Scottish footballer
 Billy Clarke (footballer, born 1987), Irish footballer

Cricket
 William Clarke (cricketer, born 1798) (1798–1856), English cricketer and team manager
 William Grasett Clarke (1821–1893), English cricketer
 William Clarke (Barbadian cricketer) (1841–1907), Barbadian cricketer
 William Clarke (cricketer, born 1846) (1846–1902), English cricketer
 William Clarke (cricketer, born 1849) (1849–1935), English cricketer

Other sports
 Boileryard Clarke (William Jones Clarke, 1868–1959), American Major League Baseball player
 William Clarke (athlete) (1873–?), British Olympic runner
 Will Clarke (cyclist) (born 1985), Australian road cyclist
 Will Clarke (triathlete) (born 1985), British triathlete
 Bill Clarke (died 2018), British professional wrestler, best known as the masked King Kendo

Science
 William Clarke (apothecary) (1609–1682), English apothecary associated with Isaac Newton
 William Branwhite Clarke (1798–1878), English geologist and clergyman, active in Australia
 William Barnard Clarke (1806–1865), English architect, cartographer and translator
 William Barnard Clarke (physician) (1807–1894), English physician and curator
 William Eagle Clarke (1853–1938), British ornithologist
 William Clarke (Canadian physician) (died 1887), Irish-born physician and politician in Ontario, Canada

Other people
 William Clarke (justice) (died c. 1706), Delaware justice, chief justice of the Pennsylvania Supreme Court
 William Clarke (antiquary) (1696–1771), English cleric and antiquary
 William Clarke (industrialist) (1831–1890), English industrialist, co-founder of Clarke Chapman
 Sir William Clarke, 1st Baronet (1831–1897), Australian businessman
 William Clarke (cryptographer) (1883–1961), British British intelligence officer and cryptographer
William Francis Clarke (1816–1890), American Jesuit educator
 William P.O. Clarke (1893–1949), U.S. Navy admiral during World War II
 William Robinson Clarke (1895–1981), British World War I pilot who was the first black pilot to fly for Britain
 William Clarke (United Kingdom railway contractor), designer of British railway stations, see Portesham railway station

Other uses
William Clarke & Son, a tobacco company founded in 1830 in Cork, Ireland
William Clarke Estate, a historic home in Orange Park, Florida
William Clarke College, an Anglican co-educational high school in Kellyville, New South Wales, Australia

See also
William Clark (disambiguation)
William Clerke (disambiguation)
Willie Clarke (disambiguation)
Will Clarke (disambiguation)